Christopher Brian McDaniel (born June 28, 1971) is an American attorney, talk radio host, and far-right politician who has served in the Mississippi State Senate since 2008.

A member of the Republican Party, McDaniel gained national attention for his Tea Party-backed 2014 Republican primary challenge to incumbent U.S. Senator Thad Cochran. After neither candidate received a majority in a hard-fought primary, Cochran narrowly defeated McDaniel in the runoff election. McDaniel ran for U.S. Senate again in 2018, winning 16.4% of the vote in the nonpartisan, four-candidate primary.

Early life and education
McDaniel was born in Laurel, Mississippi. He is the only child of Carlos and Charlotte McDaniel. He graduated with honors from Jones County Junior College and the grandson of Luke McDaniel, a country and rockabilly singer. and received a B.S. with honors from William Carey University in 1994. He then entered the University of Mississippi School of Law, graduating cum laude in 1997 with a Juris Doctor degree. McDaniel resides with his family in Ellisville, Mississippi.

Legal and radio career
In 1997, McDaniel entered a two-year federal clerkship with United States District Court Judge Charles W. Pickering. After leaving that position, he joined the law firm Hortman Harlow Bassi Robinson & McDaniel, becoming a partner in 2003. His areas of concentration include litigation, insurance defense, corporate law, products liability, commercial litigation, consumer products litigation, mass tort litigation, complex multi-party litigation, legislation, Constitutional law, and civil rights. He is licensed to practice law in Mississippi and Texas. In 2010, he was named one of the top 50 lawyers in Mississippi by the Mississippi Business Journal.

McDaniel is the former host of The Right Side Radio Show on WMXI 98.1 FM in Hattiesburg, Mississippi, nationally syndicated since 2006 by EBN Radio Network and Golden Broadcasters. The show was broadcast nationwide on ABC Radio Networks and the industry standard Starguide III system. It returned to local stations after McDaniel left the show.

Political career
McDaniel is a Republican who has served in the Mississippi Senate since 2008.

McDaniel was named 2010 Citizen of the Year by the Laurel Leader Call.

In 2012, McDaniel led a delegation to the Alamo Mission in San Antonio, Texas, for the dedication of a monument to the eight Mississippians who died when the fort was overrun in 1836.

2014 U.S. Senate campaign

In 2014, McDaniel ran for the U.S. Senate seat occupied by Thad Cochran.

Although McDaniel was not initially believed to pose a serious threat to Cochran, he proved a formidable challenger. Polling showed the lead swinging between the two and it eventually became a "50%-50% race". McDaniel was vocal about his intention to repeal Obamacare and to work to lower the national debt.

The primary was considered a marquee establishment-versus-Tea Party fight. Cochran's seniority and appropriating skills contrasted with the junior status of the rest of the state's congressional delegation. The primary was called "nasty" and full of "bizarre" twists.

In May 2014, a scandal emerged when a McDaniel supporter allegedly entered a nursing home where Cochran's bedridden wife was living and took pictures of her. The images were posted to a blog, intending to advance the rumor that Cochran was having affairs while his wife was receiving care. Four people were arrested in connection with the incident. The connection to the McDaniel campaign was disputed. One of the arrested included McDaniel ally Mark Mayfield, who was vice chairman of the state's Tea Party. In response, McDaniel said, "the violation of the privacy of Mrs. Cochran [was] out of bounds for politics and reprehensible."

Neither candidate won a majority in the primary election; McDaniel won 49.46% of the vote to Cochran's 49.02%. A runoff election was held on June 24. Despite trailing in most of the polls, Cochran won with 51.01% of the vote to McDaniel's 48.99%.

In the aftermath of the election, the McDaniel campaign claimed there were signs of voter fraud. The campaign asserted that about 3,300 Democrats had voted for Cochran in the runoff. The campaign said it was investigating whether the crossover voting violated Mississippi law. A day after the state party certified the election results, Senator Ted Cruz and some Tea Party groups backed an investigation of alleged voter fraud in the runoff. Cruz also told reporters that groups aligned with Cochran's campaign had run racially charged ads designed to persuade black voters to vote against McDaniel. Of the ads, McDaniel said that the GOP is "a party that does not need to play the race card to win."

In July 2014, the Mississippi State Supreme Court rejected McDaniel's request for access to poll books without voters' birthdates blacked out, which his attorneys argued were needed to identify fraudulent votes. In August, a Mississippi judge dismissed McDaniel's challenge. In October, the Mississippi Supreme Court affirmed the lower court's dismissal in a 4–2 decision.

2018 U.S. Senate campaign

McDaniel originally declared that he would run against Senator Roger Wicker in the 2018 Republican primary. On March 5, 2018, Thad Cochran announced he would resign effective April 1, 2018, due to health concerns. Republican Governor Phil Bryant appointed Cindy Hyde-Smith to fill the vacancy created by Cochran's retirement. A nonpartisan blanket primary to fill the Senate vacancy for the remainder of Cochran's term was scheduled for November 6, 2018. These developments prompted McDaniel to cease his primary challenge to Wicker and instead run in the nonpartisan blanket primary to fill Cochran's vacated seat. McDaniel said, "by announcing early, we are asking Mississippi Republicans to unite around my candidacy and avoid another contentious contest among GOP members that would only improve the Democrats' chances of winning the open seat." He was the second candidate to enter the race. The first, Democrat Mike Espy, declared his candidacy shortly after Cochran announced his resignation. Hyde-Smith later defeated McDaniel in a nonpartisan blanket primary with two Democrats and two Republicans contending for the office; McDaniel received 16.4% of the vote.

2023 lieutenant governor campaign
On January 30, 2023, McDaniel announced his candidacy for lieutenant governor of Mississippi in 2023, challenging incumbent Republican Delbert Hosemann in the primary.

Political positions
McDaniel has far-right political views.

Eminent domain
As a first-term senator in 2010, McDaniel urged his fellow state senators to override Governor Haley Barbour's veto of eminent domain legislation that would prevent government from taking private land for use by private companies. The override effort failed by two votes, but began a ballot initiative to amend the Mississippi Constitution. The ballot initiative passed the following year.

Healthcare
In April 2010, McDaniel led a lawsuit seeking to have the Patient Protection and Affordable Care Act (Obamacare) deemed unconstitutional.

LGBT rights and women
McDaniel has said of former Attorney General Janet Reno, "I'm not even sure Janet Reno was a woman". He has said that the Democratic Party is the party of "sex on demand, the party that supports the homosexual agenda". On January 22, 2017, McDaniel responded on Facebook to the 2017 Women's March by referring to marchers as "a bunch of unhappy liberal women" and stated that he opposes using federal funds to pay for birth control and abortion.

Immigration
In 2007, McDaniel's immigration policy, as stated on his website, plagiarized text from a number of anti-immigration groups. McDaniel opposes a pathway to citizenship or temporary work permits for undocumented immigrants. He opposes increases in residency permits and work visas.

Views on sexual assault
In a September 2018 appearance on American Family Radio, in reference to the allegation of sexual assault against U.S. Supreme Court nominee Brett Kavanaugh, McDaniel contended that sexual assault allegations "99 percent of the time are just absolutely fabricated." No research supports this claim.

Southern secessionism and the Confederacy
In his 2018 Senate campaign, McDaniel promised to preserve Mississippians' right to decide the flag of Mississippi, which at that time bore the Confederate flag. The flag features on McDaniel's campaign materials. McDaniel has spoken at conferences held by the Sons of Confederate Veterans. In 2006–2007, he made controversial statements on reparations for slavery, race, and women on his talk radio show.

In August 2017, McDaniel claimed on his Twitter account that Robert E. Lee, commander of the Confederate States Army, was opposed to slavery. (Lee accepted "the extinction of slavery" provided for by the Thirteenth Amendment, but believed slavery was good for black people, publicly opposed racial equality, and opposed granting African Americans the right to vote and other political rights.) McDaniel later defended his views on Lee in a Facebook post that was discovered to have been plagiarized from Dinesh D'Souza.

The website for McDaniel's broadcast show "The Right Side Radio Show" listed the website of the League of the South—a secessionist "Southern Nationalist" organization—as one of his favorite websites. When asked about this in 2018, McDaniel's spokesperson said McDaniel "has never endorsed the League of the South and has nothing to do with them."

Personal life
McDaniel is married to Jill Tullos McDaniel, who was the 1995 Miss Mississippi USA. They have two children. McDaniel is a Southern Baptist.

References

External links

 Chris McDaniel for U.S. Senate
 
 Profile at  Hortman Harlow Bassi Robinson & McDaniel
 

1972 births
Living people
21st-century American lawyers
21st-century American politicians
21st-century Baptists
American political commentators
Baptists from Mississippi
Candidates in the 2014 United States elections
Candidates in the 2018 United States Senate elections
Republican Party Mississippi state senators
Non-interventionism
People from Ellisville, Mississippi
People from Laurel, Mississippi
Southern Baptists
Tea Party movement activists
University of Mississippi School of Law alumni
William Carey University alumni
Far-right politicians in the United States